The 2004 Kraft Nabisco Championship was a women's professional golf tournament, held March 25–28 at Mission Hills Country Club in Rancho Mirage, California. This was the 33rd edition of the Kraft Nabisco Championship, and the 22nd edition as a major championship.

Grace Park won her only major title by one stroke, sinking a  birdie putt on the 72nd hole. Only moments earlier, runner-up Aree Song had dropped a  eagle putt to tie. Long-time tournament director Terry Wilcox called this Kraft Nabisco "the most thrilling he can recall."

The top amateur was 14-year-old Michelle Wie, four strokes back in fourth place.

Past champions in the field

Made the cut

Source:

Missed the cut

Source:

Defending champion Patricia Meunier-Lebouc gave birth to her first child in February and opted not to participate.

Final leaderboard
Sunday, March 28, 2004

Source:

Amateurs: Michelle Wie (−7), Jane Park (+2), Liz Janangelo (+6), Paula Creamer (+7).

References

External links
Golf Observer leaderboard

Chevron Championship
Golf in California
Kraft Nabisco Championship
Kraft Nabisco Championship
Kraft Nabisco Championship
Kraft Nabisco Championship